Eshani is a town and under Leadership of Wadera shado khan eshani union council of Barkhan District in the Balochistan province of Pakistan.

References

Populated places in Barkhan District
Union councils of Balochistan, Pakistan